Pura sangre ('Thoroughbred')is a Venezuelan telenovela produced by Radio Caracas Television in 1994 based on the telenovela La fiera produced by the same channel in 1978 and written by Julio César Mármol.

Lilibeth Morillo and Simón Pestana starred as the main protagonists with Carlos Villamizar as the antagonist.

Plot
In the town of San Rafael del Limón, the Paredes and Sarmiento are wealthy landowner families caught in an eternal war and struggle. Abraham Paredes is a selfish, greedy womanizer who only married once, but had children with several women: First, with a mute named Belinda de Sousa with whom he had a son, his first born Aarón De Sousa, second he had  Anastasius who suffers from epilepsy after falling off a horse when he was a child. Lastly, Damian, Derián and Eloisa who were born from his marriage with the deceased Eloísa who died at childbirth.

On the other hand, Numa Pompilio Sarmiento is the head of the other family. His children and nephews support him in his fight against the Paredes. Mauricio, the eldest, is full of vengeance just like his father, together with his cousin Numa Pompilio. His youngest son Abelardo arrives into the town from the city, and falls madly in love with Eloisa Paredes. Yomira, the only daughter of Numa Pompilio, suffers from the memory of her former love Damián Paredes who arrives to the town from the capital transformed into a priest, adding conflict to the relationship.

In the middle of this conflict appears Corazón Silvestre, a beautiful peasant who has learnt to survive the harshness of the Zulian plains. When Aaron meets her, he is attracted to her personality and decides to transform her rebel heart to turn her into a lady. But he discovers he cannot marry her since he is engaged to marry Maria Angélica Guillén, a beautiful, wealthy, refined woman from Maracaibo who will become a cruel rival for Corazón.

Cast

Lilibeth Morillo as Corazón Cristina Silvestre
Simón Pestana as Aarón De Sousa
Carlos Villamizar as Abraham Paredes
Guillermo Ferrán as Numa Pompilio Sarmiento
Crisol Carabal as Yomira Sarmiento
Vicente Tepedino as Damián Paredes
Sebastián Falco as Julio Boscán
Victoria Roberts as María Angélica Guillén
Rosario Prieto as Estacia Briceño
Lilian Rentería as Agripina Bravo
Leida Torrealba as Mercedes Silvestre
Julio Mota as Arcángel Corrales
Jessica Brown as Eloísa Paredes
Rolando Padilla as Abelardo Sarmiento
Alberto Alcalá as Mauricio Sarmiento
Janín Barboza as Evelia Corrales
Carlos Acosta as Derián Paredes
William Colmenares as Anastacio Paredes
Wilfredo Cisneros as Rafael Sarmiento
Francis Rueda as Belinda De Sousa
Carmencita Padrón as Nelly
Dante Carlé as Reinaldo Guillén
Mimí Sills as Esther Moreno De Guillén
Perla Vonasek as América de Sarmiento
Dad Dáger as Aurita Guillén
Jeanette Flores as Giselita Briceño
Samuel González as Peligro
Reina Hinojosa as Lídia de Acopini
Reinaldo Lancaster as Emilio Guillén
Natasha Moll as Tinita
Marcos Moreno as Marcos de Acopini
Freddy Salazar as Padre Ignacio
Franco Colmenares as Modisto François
Rafael Marín
Leonardo Marrero
Tony Rodríguez as Tiberio Sarmiento
Ricardo Gruber as El Turco

References

External links

Opening credits

1994 telenovelas
RCTV telenovelas
Venezuelan telenovelas
1994 Venezuelan television series debuts
1995 Venezuelan television series endings
Spanish-language telenovelas
Television shows set in Venezuela